Solemskogen is a village to the north of Oslo, Viken, Norway.

Villages in Akershus